Three ships and a naval base of the Royal Navy have been named HMS Nelson in honour of Horatio Nelson:

  was a 120-gun first rate launched in 1814. She was converted to screw propulsion and rearmed to 90 guns in 1860, and was handed over to the government of the Dominion of Victoria, Australia, in 1867. She was sold in 1898 as a storage hulk, and later used as a coal hulk, and was scrapped in 1928.
  was a  armoured cruiser, launched in 1876. She became a training ship in 1902. and she was sold as scrap in 1910.
She was launched in 1925, served during World War II, and was scrapped in 1949.
HMS Nelson (shore establishment) is the designation for HMNB Portsmouth. Until around the year 2000, it referred only to the barracks and support services site of the base in Queen's Street, Portsmouth.

Battle honours
Malta Convoys 1941−42
North Africa 1942−43
Sicily 1943
Salerno 1943
Mediterranean 1943
Normandy 1944

See also
 

Royal Navy ship names